Mario Sosa Casquero (born 1910, date of death unknown) was a Cuban footballer.

International career
He represented Cuba at the 1938 FIFA World Cup in France. Sosa appeared in two matches.

References

External links
 

1910 births
Year of death missing
Cuban footballers
Cuba international footballers
1938 FIFA World Cup players
Association football forwards